= Western Kentucky coalfield =

- Location: Kentucky, United States
- Products: Coal

The Western Kentucky is a large coal field located in the east of the United States in Kentucky. Western Kentucky represents one of the largest coal reserve in the United States having estimated reserves of 35.67 billion tonnes of coal. Other rocks in the area include conglomerate, sandstone, shale, limestone.
